Alan Bækby Hansen (born 7 November 1960) is a Danish footballer who played as a forward. He made two appearances for the Denmark national team in 1983.

References

External links
 
 

1960 births
Living people
Danish men's footballers
Association football forwards
Denmark international footballers
Denmark youth international footballers
Kolding IF players
Vejle Boldklub players
Randers FC players